Insulochamus annobonae is a species of beetle in the family Cerambycidae. It was described by Per Olof Christopher Aurivillius as Monochamus annobonae in 1928. It occurs on the island of Annobón, Equatorial Guinea.

References

Lamiini
Fauna of Annobón
Insects of Equatorial Guinea
Beetles of Africa
Beetles described in 1928
Taxa named by Per Olof Christopher Aurivillius